Oelde station is a passenger station in the Westphalian town of Oelde in the German state of North Rhine-Westphalia. It lies on the Hamm–Minden railway, one of the most heavily trafficked lines in Germany. The station is served by an hourly Regional-Express service, the Rhein-Weser-Express (RE 6) on the Cologne–Düsseldorf–Dortmund–Bielefeld–Minden route and an hourly Regionalbahn service, the Ems-Börde-Bahn (RB 69) on the Münster–Hamm–Bielefeld route, meaning that trains run approximately every 30 minutes in both directions. Both lines were previously operated by DB Regio NRW. As of December 2008 the RB 69 service has been operated by the Hamm-based eurobahn.

Services

In passenger transport the station is served by several Regional-Express and Regionalbahn services:

References

Railway stations in North Rhine-Westphalia
Railway stations in Germany opened in 1847
Buildings and structures in Warendorf (district)